Spanioptila eucnemis is a moth of the family Gracillariidae. It is known from Mexico.

References

Gracillariinae
Moths of Central America
Moths described in 1914